There have been 66 women in the Western Australian Legislative Assembly since its establishment in 1890. Women have had the right to vote since 1899 and the right to stand as candidates since 1920.

The first successful female candidate for the Legislative Assembly was Edith Cowan, who was elected as the member for West Perth in 1921 representing the Nationalist Party of Australia. This was the first time a woman had won election anywhere in Australia. Cowan was defeated in 1924 but in 1925 May Holman was elected to the seat of Forrest in a by-election, becoming the first successful Labor woman in Australia. Holman was joined by Florence Cardell-Oliver of the Nationalist Party in 1936, who would become the first female cabinet minister. Cardell-Oliver's retirement in 1956 led to a period of absence for women, until June Craig of the Liberal Party was elected in 1974, since which time women have been continuously represented in the Assembly.

Hilda Turnbull was the first National Party woman elected to the Assembly in 1989, and only two women – Liz Constable (1991–2013) and Janet Woollard (2001–2013) – have been elected as independents. Adele Carles became the first Greens member of the Assembly in 2009, although she later quit the party. Carol Martin was the first Indigenous woman elected to the Assembly in 2001.

List of women in the Western Australian Legislative Assembly

Names in bold indicate women who have been appointed as Ministers and Parliamentary Secretaries during their time in Parliament. Names in italics indicate women who were first elected at a by-election. An asterisk (*) indicates that the member also served in the Legislative Council.

Timeline

Proportion of women in the Assembly
Numbers and proportions are as they were directly after the relevant election and do not take into account by-elections, defections or other changes in membership. The Liberal column also includes that party's predecessors, the Nationalist and United parties and the Liberal and Country League. The National column includes the various National Party splinter groups in the 1920s and 1980s.

See also

 
Western Australia